In geometry, curvilinear coordinates are a coordinate system for Euclidean space in which the coordinate lines may be curved. These coordinates may be derived from a set of Cartesian coordinates by using a transformation that is locally invertible (a one-to-one map) at each point. This means that one can convert a point given in a Cartesian coordinate system to its curvilinear coordinates and back. The name curvilinear coordinates, coined by the French mathematician Lamé, derives from the fact that the coordinate surfaces of the curvilinear systems are curved.

Well-known examples of curvilinear coordinate systems in three-dimensional Euclidean space (R3) are cylindrical and spherical coordinates. A Cartesian coordinate surface in this space is a coordinate plane; for example z = 0 defines the x-y plane. In the same space, the coordinate surface r = 1 in spherical coordinates is the surface of a unit sphere, which is curved. The formalism of curvilinear coordinates provides a unified and general description of the standard coordinate systems.

Curvilinear coordinates are often used to define the location or distribution of physical quantities which may be, for example, scalars, vectors, or tensors. Mathematical expressions involving these quantities in vector calculus and tensor analysis (such as the gradient, divergence, curl, and Laplacian) can be transformed from one coordinate system to another, according to transformation rules for scalars, vectors, and tensors. Such expressions then become valid for any curvilinear coordinate system.

A curvilinear coordinate system may be simpler to use than the Cartesian coordinate system for some applications. The motion of particles under the influence of central forces is usually easier to solve in spherical coordinates than in Cartesian coordinates; this is true of many physical problems with spherical symmetry defined in R3.  Equations with boundary conditions that follow coordinate surfaces for a particular curvilinear coordinate system may be easier to solve in that system. While one might describe the motion of a particle in a rectangular box using Cartesian coordinates, it's easier to describe the motion in a sphere with spherical coordinates.  Spherical coordinates are the most common curvilinear coordinate systems and are used in Earth sciences, cartography, quantum mechanics, relativity, and engineering.

Orthogonal curvilinear coordinates in 3 dimensions

Coordinates, basis, and vectors 

For now, consider 3-D space.

It can also be defined by its curvilinear coordinates (q1, q2, q3) if this triplet of numbers defines a single point in an unambiguous way. The relation between the coordinates is then given by the invertible transformation functions:

The surfaces q1 = constant, q2 = constant, q3 = constant are called the coordinate surfaces; and the space curves formed by their intersection in pairs are called the coordinate curves. The coordinate axes are determined by the tangents to the coordinate curves at the intersection of three surfaces. They are not in general fixed directions in space, which happens to be the case for simple Cartesian coordinates, and thus there is generally no natural global basis for curvilinear coordinates.

In the Cartesian system, the standard basis vectors can be derived from the derivative of the location of point P with respect to the local coordinate

Applying the same derivatives to the curvilinear system locally at point P defines the natural basis vectors:

Such a basis, whose vectors change their direction and/or magnitude from point to point is called a local basis. All bases associated with curvilinear coordinates are necessarily local. Basis vectors that are the same at all points are global bases, and can be associated only with linear or affine coordinate systems.

For this article e is reserved for the standard basis (Cartesian) and h or b is for the curvilinear basis.

These may not have unit length, and may also not be orthogonal.  In the case that they are orthogonal at all points where the derivatives are well-defined, we define the Lamé coefficients (after Gabriel Lamé) by

and the curvilinear orthonormal basis vectors by

These basis vectors may well depend upon the position of P; it is therefore necessary that they are not assumed to be constant over a region.

In general, curvilinear coordinates allow the natural basis vectors hi not all mutually perpendicular to each other, and not required to be of unit length: they can be of arbitrary magnitude and direction. The use of an orthogonal basis makes vector manipulations simpler than for non-orthogonal. However, some areas of physics and engineering, particularly fluid mechanics and continuum mechanics, require non-orthogonal bases to describe deformations and fluid transport to account for complicated directional dependences of physical quantities.  A discussion of the general case appears later on this page.

Vector calculus

Differential elements

In orthogonal curvilinear coordinates, since the total differential change in r is

so scale factors are 

The six independent scalar products gij=hi.hj of the natural basis vectors generalize the three scale factors defined above for orthogonal coordinates. The nine gij are the components of the metric tensor, which has only three non zero components in orthogonal coordinates: g11=h1h1, g22=h2h2, g33=h3h3.

Covariant and contravariant bases

Spatial gradients, distances, time derivatives and scale factors are interrelated within a coordinate system by two groups of basis vectors:

 basis vectors that are locally tangent to their associated coordinate pathline:  are contravariant vectors (denoted by lowered indices), and
 basis vectors that are locally normal to the isosurface created by the other coordinates:  are covariant vectors (denoted by raised indices), ∇ is the del operator.

Note that, because of Einstein's summation convention, the position of the indices of the vectors is the opposite of that of the coordinates.

Consequently, a general curvilinear coordinate system has two sets of basis vectors for every point: {b1, b2, b3} is the contravariant basis, and {b1, b2, b3} is the covariant (a.k.a. reciprocal) basis. The covariant and contravariant basis vectors types have identical direction for orthogonal curvilinear coordinate systems, but as usual have inverted units with respect to each other.

Note the following important equality:

wherein  denotes the generalized Kronecker delta.

A vector v can be specified in terms of either basis, i.e.,

Using the Einstein summation convention, the basis vectors relate to the components by

and

where g is the metric tensor (see below).

A vector can be specified with covariant coordinates (lowered indices, written vk) or contravariant coordinates (raised indices, written vk). From the above vector sums, it can be seen that contravariant coordinates are associated with covariant basis vectors, and covariant coordinates are associated with contravariant basis vectors.

A key feature of the representation of vectors and tensors in terms of indexed components and basis vectors is invariance in the sense that vector components which transform in a covariant manner (or contravariant manner) are paired with basis vectors that transform in a contravariant manner (or covariant manner).

Integration

Constructing a covariant basis in one dimension

Consider the one-dimensional curve shown in Fig. 3.  At point P, taken as an origin, x is one of the Cartesian coordinates, and q1 is one of the curvilinear coordinates. The local (non-unit) basis vector is b1 (notated h1 above, with b reserved for unit vectors) and it is built on the q1 axis which is a tangent to that coordinate line at the point P. The axis q1 and thus the vector b1 form an angle  with the Cartesian x axis and the Cartesian basis vector e1.

It can be seen from triangle PAB that

where |e1|, |b1| are the magnitudes of the two basis vectors, i.e., the scalar intercepts PB and PA.  PA is also the projection of b1 on the x axis.

However, this method for basis vector transformations using directional cosines is inapplicable to curvilinear coordinates for the following reasons:

The angles that the q1 line and that axis form with the x axis become closer in value the closer one moves towards point P and become exactly equal at P.

Let point E be located very close to P, so close that the distance PE is infinitesimally small. Then PE measured on the q1 axis almost coincides with PE measured on the q1 line.

Let the infinitesimally small intercepts PD and PE be labelled, respectively, as dx and dq1. Then
.

Thus, the directional cosines can be substituted in transformations with the more exact ratios between infinitesimally small coordinate intercepts.  It follows that the component (projection) of b1 on the x axis is

.

That is, those ratios are partial derivatives of coordinates belonging to one system with respect to coordinates belonging to the other system.

Constructing a covariant basis in three dimensions

Doing the same for the coordinates in the other 2 dimensions, b1 can be expressed as:

Similar equations hold for b2 and b3 so that the standard basis {e1, e2, e3} is transformed to a local (ordered and normalised) basis {b1, b2, b3} by the following system of equations:

By analogous reasoning, one can obtain the inverse transformation from local basis to standard basis:

Jacobian of the transformation

The above systems of linear equations can be written in matrix form using the Einstein summation convention as
.

This coefficient matrix of the linear system is the Jacobian matrix (and its inverse) of the transformation. These are the equations that can be used to transform a Cartesian basis into a curvilinear basis, and vice versa.

In three dimensions, the expanded forms of these matrices are

In the inverse transformation (second equation system), the unknowns are the curvilinear basis vectors. For any specific location there can only exist one and only one set of basis vectors (else the basis is not well defined at that point). This condition is satisfied if and only if the equation system has a single solution. In linear algebra, a linear equation system has a single solution (non-trivial) only if the determinant of its system matrix is non-zero:

which shows the rationale behind the above requirement concerning the inverse Jacobian determinant.

Generalization to n dimensions

The formalism extends to any finite dimension as follows.

Consider the real Euclidean n-dimensional space, that is Rn = R × R × ... × R (n times) where R is the set of real numbers and × denotes the Cartesian product, which is a vector space.

The coordinates of this space can be denoted by: x = (x1, x2,...,xn). Since this is a vector (an element of the vector space), it can be written as:

where e1 = (1,0,0...,0), e2 = (0,1,0...,0), e3 = (0,0,1...,0),...,en = (0,0,0...,1) is the standard basis set of vectors for the space Rn, and i = 1, 2,...n is an index labelling components. Each vector has exactly one component in each dimension (or "axis") and they are mutually orthogonal (perpendicular) and normalized (has unit magnitude).

More generally, we can define basis vectors bi so that they depend on q = (q1, q2,...,qn), i.e. they change from point to point: bi = bi(q). In which case to define the same point x in terms of this alternative basis: the coordinates with respect to this basis vi also necessarily depend on x also, that is vi = vi(x). Then a vector v in this space, with respect to these alternative coordinates and basis vectors, can be expanded as a linear combination in this basis (which simply means to multiply each basis vector ei by a number vi – scalar multiplication):

The vector sum that describes v in the new basis is composed of different vectors, although the sum itself remains the same.

Transformation of coordinates

From a more general and abstract perspective, a curvilinear coordinate system is simply a coordinate patch on the differentiable manifold En (n-dimensional Euclidean space) that is diffeomorphic to the Cartesian coordinate patch on the manifold. Two diffeomorphic coordinate patches on a differential manifold need not overlap differentiably. With this simple definition of a curvilinear coordinate system, all the results that follow below are simply applications of standard theorems in differential topology.

The transformation functions are such that there's a one-to-one relationship between points in the "old" and "new" coordinates, that is, those functions are bijections, and fulfil the following requirements within their domains:

Vector and tensor algebra in three-dimensional curvilinear coordinates

Elementary vector and tensor algebra in curvilinear coordinates is used in some of the older scientific literature in mechanics and physics and can be indispensable to understanding work from the early and mid-1900s, for example the text by Green and Zerna.  Some useful relations in the algebra of vectors and second-order tensors in curvilinear coordinates are given in this section.  The notation and contents are primarily from Ogden, Naghdi, Simmonds, Green and Zerna,  Basar and Weichert, and Ciarlet.

Tensors in curvilinear coordinates

A second-order tensor can be expressed as

where  denotes the tensor product. The components Sij are called the contravariant components, Si j the mixed right-covariant components, Si j the mixed left-covariant components, and Sij the covariant components of the second-order tensor. The components of the second-order tensor are related by

The metric tensor in orthogonal curvilinear coordinates

At each point, one can construct a small line element , so the square of the length of the line element is the scalar product dx • dx and is called the metric of the space, given by:

.

The following portion of the above equation

is a symmetric tensor called the fundamental (or metric) tensor of the Euclidean space in curvilinear coordinates.

Indices can be raised and lowered by the metric:

Relation to Lamé coefficients

Defining the scale factors hi by

gives a relation between the metric tensor and the Lamé coefficients, and

where hij are the Lamé coefficients. For an orthogonal basis we also have:

Example: Polar coordinates

If we consider polar coordinates for R2,

(r, θ) are the curvilinear coordinates, and the Jacobian determinant of the transformation (r,θ) → (r cos θ, r sin θ) is r.

The orthogonal basis vectors are br = (cos θ, sin θ), bθ = (−r sin θ, r cos θ).  The scale factors are hr = 1 and hθ= r. The fundamental tensor is g11 =1, g22 =r2, g12 = g21 =0.

The alternating tensor

In an orthonormal right-handed basis, the third-order alternating tensor is defined as

In a general curvilinear basis the same tensor may be expressed as

It can also be shown that

Christoffel symbols

Christoffel symbols of the first kind 

where the comma denotes a partial derivative (see Ricci calculus). To express Γkij in terms of gij,

Since

using these to rearrange the above relations gives

Christoffel symbols of the second kind 

This implies that
 since .

Other relations that follow are

Vector operations

Vector and tensor calculus in three-dimensional curvilinear coordinates

Adjustments need to be made in the calculation of line, surface and volume integrals.  For simplicity, the following restricts to three dimensions and orthogonal curvilinear coordinates.  However, the same arguments apply for n-dimensional spaces. When the coordinate system is not orthogonal, there are some additional terms in the expressions.

Simmonds, in his book on tensor analysis, quotes Albert Einstein saying
The magic of this theory will hardly fail to impose itself on anybody who has truly understood it; it represents a genuine triumph of the method of absolute differential calculus, founded by Gauss, Riemann, Ricci, and Levi-Civita.
Vector and tensor calculus in general curvilinear coordinates is used in tensor analysis on four-dimensional curvilinear manifolds in general relativity, in the mechanics of curved shells, in examining the invariance properties of Maxwell's equations which has been of interest in metamaterials and in many other fields.

Some useful relations in the calculus of vectors and second-order tensors in curvilinear coordinates are given in this section.  The notation and contents are primarily from Ogden, Simmonds, Green and Zerna,  Basar and Weichert, and Ciarlet.

Let φ = φ(x) be a well defined scalar field and v = v(x) a well-defined vector field, and λ1, λ2... be parameters of the coordinates

Geometric elements

Integration

{| class="wikitable"
|-
!scope=col width="10px"| Operator
!scope=col width="200px"| Scalar field
!scope=col width="200px"| Vector field
|-
|Line integral
||
||
|-
| Surface integral
|| 
||
|-
| Volume integral
|| 
|| 
|-
|}

Differentiation

The expressions for the gradient, divergence, and Laplacian can be directly extended to n-dimensions, however the curl is only defined in 3D.

The vector field bi is tangent to the qi coordinate curve and forms a natural basis at each point on the curve.  This basis, as discussed at the beginning of this article, is also called the covariant curvilinear basis.  We can also define a reciprocal basis, or contravariant curvilinear basis,  bi.  All the algebraic relations between the basis vectors, as discussed in the section on tensor algebra, apply for the natural basis and its reciprocal at each point x.

{| class="wikitable"
|-
!scope=col width="10px"| Operator
!scope=col width="200px"| Scalar field
!scope=col width="200px"| Vector field
!scope=col width="200px"| 2nd order tensor field
|-
| Gradient
|| 
|| 
|| 
|-
| Divergence
|| N/A
|| 
|| 
where a is an arbitrary constant vector.
In curvilinear coordinates,

|-
| Laplacian
||
||

||
|-
| Curl
|| N/A
|| For vector fields in 3D only,

where  is the Levi-Civita symbol.
|| See Curl of a tensor field
|}

Fictitious forces in general curvilinear coordinates
By definition, if a particle with no forces acting on it has its position expressed in an inertial coordinate system, (x1, x2, x3, t), then there it will have no acceleration (d2xj/dt2 = 0). In this context, a coordinate system can fail to be “inertial” either due to non-straight time axis or non-straight space axes (or both). In other words, the basis vectors of the coordinates may vary in time at fixed positions, or they may vary with position at fixed times, or both. When equations of motion are expressed in terms of any non-inertial coordinate system (in this sense), extra terms appear, called Christoffel symbols. Strictly speaking, these terms represent components of the absolute acceleration (in classical mechanics), but we may also choose to continue to regard d2xj/dt2 as the acceleration (as if the coordinates were inertial) and treat the extra terms as if they were forces, in which case they are called fictitious forces. The component of any such fictitious force normal to the path of the particle and in the plane of the path's curvature is then called centrifugal force.

This more general context makes clear the correspondence between the concepts of centrifugal force in rotating coordinate systems and in stationary curvilinear coordinate systems. (Both of these concepts appear frequently in the literature.) For a simple example, consider a particle of mass m moving in a circle of radius r with angular speed w relative to a system of polar coordinates rotating with angular speed W. The radial equation of motion is mr” = Fr + mr(w + W)2. Thus the centrifugal force is mr times the square of the absolute rotational speed A = w + W of the particle. If we choose a coordinate system rotating at the speed of the particle, then W = A and w = 0, in which case the centrifugal force is mrA2, whereas if we choose a stationary coordinate system we have W = 0 and w = A, in which case the centrifugal force is again mrA2. The reason for this equality of results is that in both cases the basis vectors at the particle's location are changing in time in exactly the same way. Hence these are really just two different ways of describing exactly the same thing, one description being in terms of rotating coordinates and the other being in terms of stationary curvilinear coordinates, both of which are non-inertial according to the more abstract meaning of that term.

When describing general motion, the actual forces acting on a particle are often referred to the instantaneous osculating circle tangent to the path of motion, and this circle in the general case is not centered at a fixed location, and so the decomposition into centrifugal and Coriolis components is constantly changing. This is true regardless of whether the motion is described in terms of stationary or rotating coordinates.

See also

 Covariance and contravariance
 Introduction to the mathematics of general relativity
 Special cases:
 Orthogonal coordinates
 Skew coordinates
 Tensors in curvilinear coordinates
 Frenet–Serret formulas
 Covariant derivative
 Tensor derivative (continuum mechanics)
 Curvilinear perspective
 Del in cylindrical and spherical coordinates

References

Further reading

External links
 Planetmath.org Derivation of Unit vectors in curvilinear coordinates
 MathWorld's page on Curvilinear Coordinates
 Prof. R. Brannon's E-Book on Curvilinear Coordinates
 Wikiversity:Introduction to Elasticity/Tensors#The divergence of a tensor field – Wikiversity, Introduction to Elasticity/Tensors.

Coordinate systems
3